The Little Prince and the Aviator is a musical with a book by Hugh Wheeler, lyrics by Don Black, and music by John Barry.

Based on the classic book by Antoine de Saint-Exupéry, the musical deviates from the original in that aviator Toni, whose plane crashes in the Sahara Desert, explicitly is real-life author Saint-Exupéry, and the plot alternates flashbacks to actual events in his life with his interaction with the fictional Little Prince, a refugee from Asteroid B-612.

Undaunted by the critical and commercial failure of the 1974 musical screen adaptation by Lerner and Loewe, A. Joseph Tandet, a co-producer of the movie who owned the rights to the story, proceeded with his plans for a Broadway production. To save money, he decided to forgo an out-of-town tryout.

Previews were originally scheduled to begin on December 31, 1981 at the Alvin Theatre. The first preview was canceled at the last minute, after a change in both director and choreographer late in the rehearsal period; the production actually began previews on January 1, 1982. Late in rehearsals, Robert Kalfin was replaced as director by Jerry Adler and Billy Wilson replaced original choreographer Dania Krupska. The production starred Michael York as the Aviator and Anthony Rapp as the Little Prince, with Ellen Greene in a supporting role and Gordon Greenberg as young Georges. The show closed after twenty previews.

Producer Tandet sued the Nederlander Organization, claiming they had forced him to shut down the production with their demands for more money during its final week. He eventually was awarded $1,000,000, representing two-thirds of his investment.

Song list

Act I      
 Par Avion - Toni, Georges and Suzanne 
 Power Comes, Power Goes - Snake 
 I Pity the Poor Poor Parisiennes - Toni 
 Making Every Minute Count - Toni, Georges and Pilots 
 Made for Each Other - Toni and Rose 
 Wind, Sand, Stars - Toni, Georges and Pilots 
 First Impressions - Little Prince 
 A Day Will Never Be the Same - Fennec and Pilots 
 I've Got You to Thank for All This - Suzanne 
 I Don't Regret a Thing - Toni 
 We Couldn't We Mustn't We Won't - Toni, Suzanne as a Child and Georges as a Child

Act II      
 Watch Out for the Baobabs - Little Prince 
 I Like My Misfortunes to Be Taken Seriously - Toni 
 The Volcano Song - Little Prince 
 More Than Just a Pretty Flower - Rose 
 First Impressions (Reprise) - Little Prince 
 The Volcano Song (Reprise) - Little Prince 
 Playground of the Planets - Little Prince 
 It Was You - Georges 
 Grain of Sand - Little Prince 
 I Don't Regret a Thing (Reprise) - Toni 
 Sunset Song - Little Prince 
 Little Prince/Stars Will Be Laughing - Toni and Little Prince

References

External links
 

1981 musicals
Broadway musicals
Works based on The Little Prince
Aviation musicals
Musicals by John Barry (composer)
Musicals by Don Black (lyricist)
Musicals by Hugh Wheeler